Eastern Shore District High School is a public school in the Musquodoboit Harbour area east of Dartmouth, Nova Scotia, Canada. It is operated by the Halifax Regional Centre for Education (HRCE).

Eastern Shore District High School opened to students in September 1965. The two student populations were combined to form the new school, the first were those from Robert Jamieson High School in Oyster Pond,: the second were those students who lived in the communities of Lake Echo, Porters Lake and Chezzetcook who had been attending Graham Creighton High School. The arrival of the 600 students essentially doubled the population of Musquodoboit Harbour. Musquodoboit Harbour in 1965 was being viewed as a viable alternative to city living. The following quote ran in the Dartmouth Daily Press on July 8, 1965, once the residence of the people who were born there who did business in the district, the Harbour is now largely an outpost of commuters, navy people, Dalhousie professors, businessmen, shipyard workers. It has also become a favorite place for retirement, and probably one of the reasons has been, besides the well-settled, well-serviced village, the hospital itself which has been open since 1949. In 1979, a junior high school opened in Gaetz Brook. From that point on Eastern Shore High was used for grades ten to twelve, with grades seven, eight and nine attending Gaetz Brook Junior High. As of 2007, ESDH has two feeder schools, Gaetz Brook Junior High, and Oyster Pond Academy.
 
The school mascot is a fisherman and sports teams are the Schooners. The school colours are gold and blue.

ESDH fields sports teams in ice hockey, wrestling, track & field, fastball, softball, soccer, rugby and basketball.

ESDH has many active clubs as well, including Extra-Curricular Concert and Jazz Bands, Robotics, Debate, Musical Theatre, and GSA amongst others. The school also boasts an active, respected Student Council. Current council is composed of roughly 30 councillors. 
The School underwent renovations in 2016, including a new gymnasium, lobby, office spaces, and parking lot.
The School maintains the yearly tradition of the ESDH Walk-a-thon. Students must raise a minimum of $25 and walk 12 km of the Musquodoboit Trailway. This is the school's largest fundraiser of each academic year. The walk is followed by a barbecue, and many activities around the school grounds organized by the Student Council. The 2015 Walk-a-thon occurred on 14 October, with a fundraising goal of $10,000.

Notable alumni
 Steve Giles, class of 1990, Olympic Bronze medal canoer at the 2000 Sydney Olympics
 Chad Doucette, class of 2006, contestant on CTV's "Canadian Idol" the same year he graduated

References

Website

High schools in Halifax, Nova Scotia
Schools in Halifax, Nova Scotia